Yuliya Olehivna Khavaldzhy-Blahinya (also transliterated Yuliia or Iulia, born February 21, 1990, in Lviv) is a Ukrainian female wrestler. She is the 2008 World bronze medalist and 2011 European champion in the 51 kg category.

She competed for Ukraine at the 2016 Summer Olympics.

References

External links
 
 
 
 
 

1990 births
Living people
Ukrainian female sport wrestlers
Olympic wrestlers of Ukraine
Wrestlers at the 2016 Summer Olympics
World Wrestling Championships medalists
Universiade medalists in wrestling
Universiade bronze medalists for Ukraine
European Games medalists in wrestling
European Games silver medalists for Ukraine
Wrestlers at the 2019 European Games
Sportspeople from Lviv
European Wrestling Championships medalists
Medalists at the 2013 Summer Universiade
21st-century Ukrainian women